Elvira is an unincorporated community in Johnson County, Illinois, United States. No numbered highways pass through Elvira; the closest state highway is Illinois Route 37, to the east.

History
Elvira was the county seat of Johnson County before Vienna, the current county seat.

References

Unincorporated communities in Johnson County, Illinois
Unincorporated communities in Illinois